The Saluda Mountains are a mountain range that straddles along the North Carolina and South Carolina border, in the southeastern United States.  They are part of the Blue Ridge Province of the Southern Appalachian Mountains.

Geography
The range begins at Standingstone Mountain, near Caesars Head State Park, and go northeasterly to Blakes Peak, near Saluda, North Carolina.  Straddling the North and South Carolina state line, it is flanked by the Green and Saluda rivers.

Notable summits
Listed are the ten highest summits in the range.

Geology

History

References

External links

Blue Ridge Mountains
Subranges of the Appalachian Mountains
Mountain ranges of North Carolina
Mountain ranges of South Carolina
Landforms of Greenville County, South Carolina
Mountains of Henderson County, North Carolina
Landforms of Polk County, North Carolina